This is a bibliography of the works of John Banim and Michael Banim. Many of their works were published pseudonymously under the name "The O'Hara Family". John used the name Barnes O'Hara, while Michael used the name Abel O'Hara.

Fiction
Tales by the O'Hara Family, First Series, 1825.
Crohoore of the Billhook by Michael Banim. 
The Fetches by John Banim.
The Peep O' Day, or John Doe by John and Michael Banim.
Tales by the O'Hara Family, Second Series, 1826.
The Nowlans by John Banim.
Peter of the Castle by John and Michael Banim.
The Boyne Water by John Banim, 1826. 
The Anglo-Irish of the Nineteenth Century by John Banim, (published anonymously), 1828.
The Croppy: A Tale of 1798 by Michael Banim, 1828.
The Denounced by John Banim, 1830.
The Smuggler by John Banim, 1831.
The Ghost-Hunter and His Family by Michael Banim, 1833.
The Mayor of Windgap by Michael Banim, 1835.
The Bit o' Writin (stories) by John and Michael Banim, 1838.
The Bit o' Writin 
The Irish Lord Lieutenant and His Double
The Family of the Cold Feet
The Hare-Hound and the Witch
The Soldier's Billet
A Peasant Girl's Love
The Hall of the Castle
The Half-Brothers
Twice Lost, But Saved
The Faithful Servant
The Roman Merchant
Ill Got, Ill Gone
The Church-Yard Watch
The Last of the Storm
The Rival Dreamers
The Substitute
The White Bristol
The Stolen Sheep
The Publican's Dream
The Ace of Clubs
Father Connell by John and Michael Banim, 1842.
Clough Fion by Michael Banim, 1852.
The Town of the Cascades by Michael Banim, 1864.

Drama, essays and poetry
The Celt's Paradise, in Four Duans (poem) by John Banim, 1821.
Damon and Pythias (play) by John Banim, 1821.
Revelations of the Dead Alive by John Banim, (essays, published anonymously), 1824.
Chaunt of the Cholera: Songs for Ireland by John and Michael Banim, 1831.

Sources

External links
 The Works of John and Michael Banim from Archive.org

Bibliographies by writer
Bibliographies of Irish writers